is a former Japanese football player.

Playing career
Ego was born in Hyogo Prefecture on June 7, 1979. After graduating from Juntendo University, he joined the J2 League club Ventforet Kofu in 2002. On July 10, he debuted as a substitute midfielder against Sagan Tosu, which was the only match he played in 2002. In 2003, he moved to the Japan Football League club SC Tottori. He became a regular player and played often during the next three seasons. In 2006, he moved to the newly promoted J2 League club, Ehime FC. He played often as a regular player. However, he did not play as much in 2009 and retired at the end of the 2010 season.

Club statistics

References

External links

1979 births
Living people
Juntendo University alumni
Association football people from Hyōgo Prefecture
Japanese footballers
J2 League players
Japan Football League players
Ventforet Kofu players
Gainare Tottori players
Ehime FC players
Association football midfielders